Chinese Buddhist sculpture has been produced throughout the history of Buddhism in China. Sculptural pieces include representations of Siddhārtha Gautama, often known as the "Enlightened One" or "Buddha", Bodhisattvas, monks and various deities. China was introduced to the teachings of Buddhism as early as the 2nd century BCE, during China's Han Dynasty, becoming more established during the 2nd century CE. The earliest representations did not start as sculptures of the human form, but rather an empty seat, footprint, tree or stupa, an architectural form eventually inspiring the creation of pagodas in China.  

The practice started in rock-cut cave temples where carvings, mostly in relief, of images enveloped chambers and complexes illustrating the beliefs associated to the Buddha's teachings. Creating these temples and sculptures not only garnered merit aligned to their own personal growth, but gave devotees a reference for worship and meditative inspiration.  
Major rock-cut sites, with large groups of excavated caves, include the Yungang Grottoes, Longmen Grottoes, Maijishan Grottoes, and Mogao Caves.  

Sculptures in the round, first began in India and eventually came to production in China during the 4th century CE. While inspired by Indian renderings, various sittings positions, facial expressions and clothing types culminated a visual mix. Sculptures with slim bodies and thicker garments embodied Chinese traditions as opposed to Indian variations depicting larger physiques & sheer clothing. Media for these sculptures also ranged from sandstone, limestone, wood, ceramic, gilt bronze to copper alloy. Despite the monotone appearances of remaining sculptures today, these works were once brightly painted with an array of pigments.       

Initially, only the Buddha was the main person or figure depicted. Bodhisattvas were later created as standalone works instead of as an attendant to the Buddha. In China, two important Bodhisattvas were Avalokiteshvara (Guanyin) and Manjushri (Wenshu) who embodied wisdom and compassion, virtues important for achieving a state of enlightenment and application of "Pure Land" or "Zen" Buddhism. During the 4th and 6th century, China was experiencing a time of war in which followers believed their devotional piety would offer guidance, health and wealth to their provinces and rulers. Deities were considered protectors of the Buddhist traditions and became more elaborate in their display as Buddhism took new forms in the following centuries.

See also
Yixian glazed pottery luohans
Guishan Guanyin Colossal modern sculpture
Greco-Buddhist art
Iconography of Gautama Buddha in Laos and Thailand
Korean Buddhist sculpture
Lao Buddhist sculpture
Thai Buddhist sculpture

References

Chinese sculpture
Buddhism in China